Emmanuel-Marie Longin Spindler (4 September 1879 – 25 July 1961) was a French equestrian. He competed in two events at the 1928 Summer Olympics.

References

1879 births
1961 deaths
French male equestrians
Olympic equestrians of France
Equestrians at the 1928 Summer Olympics
Sportspeople from Montbéliard